Olton railway station serves the Olton area of Solihull, in the West Midlands of England.  The station is operated by West Midlands Trains, and is also served by Chiltern Railways services. The entrance seen in the centre where the station's booking office is located leads into a tunnel which runs under the tracks providing an access staircase and lift to the island platform. The station also has a car park and bicycle racks.

History

Origins
Olton station was opened in 1869 on the GWR's Oxford & Birmingham Branch and its prime role was as a suburban passenger station for Birmingham commuters, explaining why the booking office was located on the down platform.

Olton originally had two signal boxes, the first of which only had 10 levers. It was built by McKenzie and Holland and located at the  end of the up platform which was replaced in June 1913 but was ultimately closed in 1933.

Expansion
Olton station originally had a two-platform configuration with basic facilities, but taking advantage of the Development (Loan Guarantees and Grants) Act 1929, the Great Western Railway continued to quadruple the Birmingham Main Line as far as Lapworth, rebuilding five stations including Olton with two wide island platforms in 1932. The new approach 'Station Drive' was also constructed.

Current layout
The platform building has been significantly reduced by the removal of its roof canopy.

Incidents 

Showell's Dictionary of Birmingham, discussing railway accidents in the city, notes that:

Services
Also a limited number of Chiltern Railways services stop here in the late evening and a single service operates in the morning commuter peak period.

On Sundays, there is an hourly service each way between Stourbridge Junction and Dorridge.

References

External links

Warwickshire's Railways: Olton station
Rail Around Birmingham and the West Midlands: Olton station

Railway stations in Solihull
DfT Category E stations
Former Great Western Railway stations
Railway stations in Great Britain opened in 1869
Railway stations served by Chiltern Railways
Railway stations served by West Midlands Trains
1869 establishments in England